is a Japanese table tennis player.

During the 2018 ITTF Challenge Series season she won unprecedented ten titles, including four senior singles titles.

Achievements

ITTF Tours
Women's singles

Women's doubles

References

1997 births
Japanese female table tennis players
Living people
Sportspeople from Chiba Prefecture
People from Asahi, Chiba